Heorhiy Chymerys (born 5 October 1972) is a Ukrainian modern pentathlete. He competed at the 1996 Summer Olympics and the 2000 Summer Olympics.

References

1972 births
Living people
Ukrainian male modern pentathletes
Olympic modern pentathletes of Ukraine
Modern pentathletes at the 1996 Summer Olympics
Modern pentathletes at the 2000 Summer Olympics
Place of birth missing (living people)